Viktor Lisitsyn (17 October 1926 – 20 December 1976) was a Soviet equestrian. He competed in the individual jumping event at the 1972 Summer Olympics.

References

1926 births
1976 deaths
Soviet male equestrians
Olympic equestrians of the Soviet Union
Equestrians at the 1972 Summer Olympics
Place of birth missing